The South African Railways Class  of 1972 is a diesel-electric locomotive.

Between March 1972 and May 1973, the South African Railways placed seventy Class  General Electric type U15C diesel-electric locomotives in branch line service.

Manufacturer
The South African Class  type GE U15C diesel-electric locomotive was designed and built for the South African Railways (SAR) by General Electric (GE) and imported. The first batch of fifty locomotives was delivered in 1972, numbered in the range from 35-001 to 35-050, with the first locomotives arriving in March. The last locomotives arrived in May 1973.

Class 35 series

GE and GM-EMD designs

Both manufacturers also produced locomotives for the South African Classes 33, 34 and 36.

The locomotive has interlinked bogies, hence the Co+Co wheel arrangement classification. The linkage is usually hidden from view by the saddle-shaped fuel tank.

Distinguishing Features
With the two GE U15C Class 35 models, the Class  can be distinguished from the Class  by the length of the humps on their long hoods, the Class  having a hump that is more than twice as long as that of the Class . An externally visible modification which was done during major overhauls is the addition of a saddle hood astride the long hump of the Class . By 2013 this modification had been done on a large number of Class  units, but no similar modification was done on any Class .

Service

South African Railways
The Class 35 is South Africa’s standard branch line diesel-electric locomotive. The GE Class  was designed to operate on light rail and they work on most branch lines in the central, western, southern and southeastern parts of the country.

In the Western Cape, they work out of Cape Town on the branch lines to Bitterfontein, Saldanha and Caledon, and out of Worcester to George. A threesome is allocated to the Swartkops depot in Port Elizabeth from where they work the Passenger Rail Agency of South Africa (PRASA) MetroRail commuter trains to Uitenhage.

Zambia
Between October 1978 and May 1993, Zambia Railways (ZR) hired locomotives to solve its chronic shortages in motive power, mainly from South Africa but at times also from Zaire, Zimbabwe, the TAZARA Railway and even the Zambian Copper Mines. In Zambia, the South African locomotives were mainly used on goods trains between Livingstone and Kitwe, sometimes in tandem with a ZR locomotive and occasionally also on passenger trains.

The first period of hire lasted from October 1978 until about April 1981. The South African fleet in Zambia was never constant, since locomotives were continually exchanged as they became due back in South Africa for their three-monthly services. 

The pool of Class  locomotives allocated by the Railways for hire to ZR included the locomotives annotated "Zambia" in the "allocation" column in the table. The first Class  units to serve in Zambia were on hire by May 1980. They served there for less than a year, being employed on road work as well as shunting. By the end of March 1981 the last Class  unit to remain there was no. 35-064 which was due to return to South Africa as soon as the last of ZR’s new Krupp-built diesel locomotives, no. , was delivered.

NLPI Ltd.
NLPI Limited, abbreviated from New Limpopo Projects Investments, is a Mauritius-registered company which specialises in private sector investments using the build-operate-transfer (BOT) concept. It had three connected railway operations in Zimbabwe and Zambia that formed a rail link between South Africa and the Democratic Republic of Congo.

 The Beitbridge Bulawayo Railway (BBR) was commissioned on 1 September 1999 and operates between Beit Bridge and Bulawayo in Zimbabwe.
 Since February 2004 NLPI Logistics (NLL or LOG) has been operating between Bulawayo and Victoria Falls on the Zimbabwe-Zambia border.
 Since February 2003 the Railway Systems of Zambia (RSZ) operated on the former Zambian Railways (ZR) line from Victoria Falls to Sakania in the Congo.

In Zambia, the RSZ locomotive fleet included former ZR locomotives, but the rest of the locomotive fleet of all three operations consisted of South African GM-EMD Classes 34-200,  and 34-800 and GE Classes  and  locomotives. These units were sometimes marked or branded as either BBR or LOG or both but their status, whether leased or loaned, was unclear since they were still on the TFR roster and still often worked in South Africa as well. The units did not appear to be restricted to working in any one of the three operations sections and have been observed being transferred between Zimbabwe and Zambia across the bridge at Victoria Falls as required. Class  locomotives which serve with NLPI include the locomotives annotated "NLPI" in the "allocation" column in the table.

Zambia Railways, the state-owned holding company, resumed control of the Zambian national rail network on 11 September 2012. This followed the Zambian government’s decision to revoke the operating concession which had been awarded to RSZ after Finance Minister Alexander Chikwanda claimed that RSZ had "blatantly disregarded the provisions of the agreement" and had been "acting in a manner prejudicial to the interests of Zambians”.

Works numbers
The Class  builder’s works numbers and where applicable, leased service in Zambia or more recently with NLPI are listed in the table.

Liveries
The Class 35-000 were all delivered in the SAR Gulf Red livery with signal red buffer beams, yellow side stripes on the long hood sides and a yellow V on each end. In the 1990s many of the Class 35-000 units began to be repainted in the Spoornet orange livery with a yellow and blue chevron pattern on the buffer beams. In the late 1990s many were repainted once again, this time in the Spoornet blue livery with outline numbers on the long hood sides. After 2008 in the Transnet Freight Rail (TFR) era, many were repainted in the TFR red, green and yellow livery.

Illustration
The main picture shows no. 35-020 in the Transnet Freight Rail livery and with a saddle hood in the Orex Yard at Saldanha. The other liveries that were applied to Class  and the saddle hood modification are illustrated below. The last picture shows the top of a locomotive with a saddle hood. It was involved in a major derailment near Moorreesburg when the track roadbed was washed away during heavy rain and flooding.

References

3420
C-C locomotives
Co′Co′ locomotives
Co+Co locomotives
General Electric locomotives
Cape gauge railway locomotives
Railway locomotives introduced in 1972
1972 in South Africa